Sir Pupuke Robati, KBE (9 April 1925 – 26 April 2009) was a Cook Island politician. He served as Prime Minister of the Cook Islands from 29 July 1987 to 1 February 1989.

Robati was from the island of Rakahanga. He completed his primary and secondary schooling in Manihiki and Rarotonga. He studied medicine at the Fiji School of Medicine and graduated as a surgeon in 1948. On returning to the Cook Islands, he worked in Rarotonga, Mangaia, and Atiu, eventually rising to be director of public health. In 1966, he received training from the Faculty of Medicine of the University of Otago in New Zealand and graduated with a Diploma of Public Health.

Political career

Robati was elected to the Legislative Assembly of the Cook Islands in the 1965 election as an independent representing the district of Rakahanga. He was re-elected in the 1968 election, and in 1972 he joined the newly created Democratic Party. He was re-elected in eight more general elections as a candidate for the Democratic Party.

Beginning in 1978, Robati was the Deputy Premier in the Cabinet of Premier Tom Davis. On 29 July 1987, he succeeded Davis as Prime Minister after Davis failed three times to pass a budget through Parliament. During his 18 months as Prime Minister, the Parliament of the Cook Islands enacted a constitutional amendment that added a preamble to the constitution which recognised the "heritage of Christian principles" in the Cook Islands and declared that the people of the Cook Islands "remember to keep holy the Sabbath Day, being the day of the week, which, according to a person's belief and conscience, is the Sabbath of the Lord." 

The defeat of the Democratic Party in the election of 1989 ended Robati's tenure as Prime Minister. From 2001 to 2004, he was the Speaker of the Cook Islands Parliament. In the 2004 election, Robati lost his seat to the independent candidate Piho Rua. The election was later subject to an unsuccessful electoral petition. This defeat marked the end of its political career. At the time of his defeat, he was the longest serving Cook Islands MP.

Robati was a boxer, and in 1944 was the Cook Islands' champion bantamweight boxer. He was the chair of the Cook Islands' federation of amateur boxing for more than 30 years.

Robati died in Auckland, New Zealand. He was buried on Rakahanga.

Recognition
In 1977, Robati was awarded the Queen Elizabeth II Silver Jubilee Medal. He was appointed an Officer of the Order of the British Empire in the 1991 New Year Honours. In 2001, he was promoted to Knight Commander of the Order of the British Empire by Queen Elizabeth II.

References

1925 births
2009 deaths
Prime Ministers of the Cook Islands
Speakers of the Cook Islands Parliament
Deputy Prime Ministers of the Cook Islands
Cook Island male boxers
Cook Island knights
Democratic Party (Cook Islands) politicians
People from Rakahanga
Knights Commander of the Order of the British Empire
Fiji School of Medicine alumni
University of Otago alumni
Cook Island medical doctors
20th-century New Zealand politicians
20th-century physicians